Ptelina carnuta, the bordered buff, is a butterfly in the family Lycaenidae. It is found in Guinea, Sierra Leone, Liberia, Ivory Coast, Ghana, Togo, southern Nigeria, Cameroon, Gabon, the Republic of the Congo, the Central African Republic, the Democratic Republic of the Congo (Haut-Uele, Ituri, Tshopo, Equateur, Kinshasa, Sankuru and Lualaba), Uganda and north-western Tanzania. The habitat consists of forests.

Adult males and females feed at extrafloral nectaries of vine tendrils and bamboo and on shoots of plants belonging to the family Marantaceae.

References

Butterflies described in 1873
Poritiinae
Butterflies of Africa
Taxa named by William Chapman Hewitson